Morgan Simon (born 1987) is a French director and screenwriter born in Paris.

Life and career 

Morgan Simon studied screenwriting at La Fémis in Paris. In 2016, his short film Try To Die Young was a César Award nominee.

A Taste of Ink, his first feature film, was developed at L’Atelier de la Cinéfondation during the 2015 Cannes Film Festival, as well as The Jerusalem International Film Lab, rubbing shoulders with László Nemes’s Son of Saul.
A Taste of Ink premiered at the 64th San Sebastián Film Festival in the New Directors section and was awarded by a special mention of the jury. It received fifteen awards and was selected by more than fifty festivals, such as Rotterdam, Shanghai, Stockholm, Los Angeles, Zurich, Jerusalem. A Taste of Ink was released in France on January 25, 2017 with Kévin Azaïs, Monia Chokri and Nathan Willcocks as main actors.

In 2018, Simon took part in the Queer Palm jury at the 71st Cannes Film Festival rewarding Girl directed by Lukas Dhont. In 2019, his 35mm short film Ghost Pleasure was selected at the Directors' Fortnight during the 72nd Cannes Film Festival. In 2021, he directed We Shall Meet Again, a short film dealing with migration and narrated by the French writer Édouard Louis.

Filmography

Feature film 
 2017: A Taste of Ink (Compte tes blessures)

Short films 
 2011: A Long Sadness (Une longue tristesse)
 2011: Goose
 2012: American Football
 2014: Try To Die Young (Essaie de mourir jeune)
 2015: Wake The Dead (Réveiller les morts)
 2019: Ghost Pleasure (Plaisir Fantôme)
 2021: We Shall Meet Again (Nous nous reverrons)

Music videos 
 2017: This Loneliness Won’t Be The Death Of Me - Being As An Ocean
 2018: Ces garçons-là - Radio Elvis

Video games 
 2013: Beyond: Two Souls by David Cage - script editor

Awards and nominations 
 2014: Screenplay Grand Jury Junior Prize for A Taste of Ink
 2015: UniFrance Prize nomination for Try To Die Young
 2016: César Award nomination of the best short film for Try To Die Young
 2016: Special mention of the jury for A Taste of Ink at San Sebastián Film Festival

References

External links

French film directors
French screenwriters
Writers from Paris
1987 births
Living people